Vespoli is a surname. Notable people with the surname include:

 Dana Vespoli (born 1972), American pornographic actress and film director
 Luigi Vespoli (1834–1861), Italian composer
 Mike Vespoli (born 1946), American rower and coach

Italian-language surnames